
Hans Johannsen (29 January 1913 – 5 March 1961) was a German chief engineer on a U-boat in World War II and recipient of the Knight's Cross of the Iron Cross.

Awards
 Wehrmacht Long Service Award 4th Class (1 January 1939)
 Iron Cross (1939) 2nd Class (20 April 1940) & 1st Class (2 March 1941)
 U-boat War Badge (1939) (3 January 1941)
 German Cross in Gold on 17 November 1942 as Leutnant (Ing.) on U-96 in the 7. Unterseebootflottille
 U-Boat Front Clasp in Bronze (13 November 1944)
 Knight's Cross of the Iron Cross on 31 March 1945 as Oberleutnant (Ing.) and chief engineer on U-802

References

Citations

Bibliography

 
 
 

1913 births
1961 deaths
People from Nordfriesland
Kriegsmarine personnel of World War II
Recipients of the Gold German Cross
Recipients of the Knight's Cross of the Iron Cross
People from the Province of Schleswig-Holstein
Military personnel from Schleswig-Holstein